George Kellgren (b. May 23, 1943) is a Swedish-born firearms designer, inventor and founder of the gun manufacturer Kel-Tec. His designs include the Intratec TEC-9, Kel-Tec P-11, Kel-Tec KSG, Kel-Tec SUB-2000 carbine and Grendel .380 ACP pocket pistol.

Kellgren is the owner and Chief Engineer of Kel-Tec CNC. He designed many firearms earlier for Husqvarna and Swedish Interdynamics AB in Sweden. He moved to the USA in 1979 and his original USA designs were for Intratec and Grendel brand firearms. He founded Kel-Tec in 1991.

References

Firearm designers
20th-century American inventors
Swedish emigrants to the United States
Living people
1943 births